Bassham is a surname, notable people with the name include:
 Alan Bassham (1933–1982), English football right back
 Diane Bassham, plant pathologist
 James Bassham (1922–2012), American scientist
 Lanny Bassham (born 1947), American sports shooter

References 

English-language surnames